Philippe Grass (6 May 1801 – 9 April 1876) was a French sculptor.

Career
Born in Wolxheim, Alsace, Grass was a pupil of Landolin Ohmacht and Baron François Joseph Bosio. From 1820 to 1823, he studied at the École des Beaux-Arts de Paris. After his return to Alsace, he was appointed sculptor of the Fondation de l'Œuvre Notre-Dame in Strasbourg. In 1865, he became a knight of the Legion of Honour. He made the portrait of his friend Émile Souvestre on his tomb on the Père Lachaise Cemetery.

He died in Strasbourg.

Selected works
 Statue du général Jean-Baptiste Kléber, bronze, 1840
 Statue du préfet Adrien de Lezay-Marnésia, 1845, in Strasbourg
 Jugement dernier, on the facade of the cathedral of Strasbourg
 Icare déployant ses ailes, 1831
 Suzanne au bain, 1834
 Jeune Paysanne, 1839

References

External links
 

1801 births
1876 deaths
19th-century French sculptors
French male sculptors
People from Bas-Rhin
19th-century French male artists